Bolokhovo is a town in Kireyevsky District of Tula Oblast, Russia, located on the Olen River (Oka's basin),  southeast of Tula, the administrative center of the oblast. Population:

History
It was granted town status in 1943.

Administrative and municipal status
Within the framework of administrative divisions, it is incorporated within Kireyevsky District as Bolokhovo Town Under District Jurisdiction. As a municipal division, Bolokhovo Town Under District Jurisdiction is incorporated within Kireyevsky Municipal District as Bolokhovo Urban Settlement.

References

Sources

Notes

External links
Official website of Bolokhovo 
Bolokhovo Business Directory 

Cities and towns in Tula Oblast